Morristown is a NJ Transit rail station on the Morristown Line, located in Morristown, in Morris County, New Jersey, United States. It serves an average of 1,800 passengers on a typical weekday. Construction of the historic station began in 1912 and the facility opened November 3, 1913. A station agent and waiting room are available weekdays. The station's interior was featured in Cyndi Lauper's "Time After Time" video in 1984. Just west of the station, at Baker Interlocking, the Morristown and Erie Railway branches off the NJT line. The M&E's offices and shop are here.

Morristown received ADA mini-high level platforms in 2005 to make the station handicapped accessible. The eastbound ramp is near Morris Street and the westbound ramp is just west of the old freight house. Morristown station has 455 parking spaces spread across three different lots near the station.

History
A predecessor station was the terminus of the Morris and Essex Railroad, using the same railbed, constructed in 1835.

Ultimately the line extended to the east to Hoboken and the Hudson River connecting to New York by ferry.

The line was previously used by a series of Delaware, Lackawanna & Western and Erie Lackawanna railway companies from the 19th century until the 1960s. The Morristown and Erie Railroad (not to be confused with the Morris and Essex) operated passenger service to  until 1928. In earlier years long distance trains, such as the Chicagoan and the Lackawanna Limited, stopped at the station on their trips west. Since 1947, main line interstate trains going west beyond Dover station bypassed the station. However, in spring 2021, Amtrak announced plans for potential New York–Scranton route. Amtrak included Morristown station as an intermediate stop between Summit station and Dover station.

The 1913-built Delaware, Lackawanna and Western station house was designed by Frank J. Nies and has been on the National Register of Historic Places since 1980.

Station layout
The station has two tracks, each with a mini-high and low-level side platform.

See also
National Register of Historic Places listings in Morris County, New Jersey
Operating Passenger Railroad Stations Thematic Resource (New Jersey)

Bibliography

References

External links

 Morris Street entrance from Google Maps Street View
 Station House from Google Maps Street View
 Lafayette Avenue entrance from Google Maps Street View

Morristown, New Jersey
NJ Transit Rail Operations stations
Railway stations in the United States opened in 1838
Railway stations on the National Register of Historic Places in New Jersey
Former Delaware, Lackawanna and Western Railroad stations
Railway stations in Morris County, New Jersey
National Register of Historic Places in Morris County, New Jersey
New Jersey Register of Historic Places
1838 establishments in New Jersey